The 80th Oregon Legislative Assembly convened for its first of two regular sessions on January 22, 2019, and met for three special sessions, the last of which concluded on December 21, 2020.

In the November 2018 elections, the Democratic Party of Oregon gained supermajority status in both houses: one seat in the Senate for an 18–12 majority, and three seats in the House for a 38–22 majority. From May 29 to June 28, 2019, the 10th senate district was vacant, following the death of senate minority leader Jackie Winters.

Notable legislation

Successful 
 HB 2001: Legalizing the upzoning of single-family-zoned neighborhoods to duplexes in cities above 10,000 in population, and legalizing the building of larger multi-family houses in cities above 25,000, including the Portland metropolitan area.
 SB 861: Approving state-funded postage for mail-in ballots
 HB 2007: Requiring a phase-out of all pre-2007 model year diesel trucks from Portland roads by 2025
 HB 2005: family/sick leave bill 
 HB 2015: allowing drivers licenses for undocumented immigrants
 SB 1013: narrowing the number of death penalty offenses
 SB 998: Legalizing the Idaho stop for bicyclists
 SB 870: National Popular Vote Interstate Compact
 HB 3216: Allowing lawsuits for racially-motivated frivolous 9-1-1 calls
 SB 420: Expanding expungements of non-violent marijuana-related offenses
 SB 577: Adding gender identity as a protected class in hate crimes
 SB 320: Keeping most of Oregon on Daylight Saving Time on a year-round basis (the part of Oregon in the Mountain Time Zone is exempt)
 SB 90: Placing restrictions on the distribution of plastic straws by restaurants and other food establishments

Sent to referendum 
 HB 2270: Raising the tobacco tax to fund healthcare
 SJR 18: Constitutional amendment to define campaign finance limits

Unsuccessful 
 HB 2020: Cap-and-trade
 HB 3063: Removal of religious objections to mandatory vaccines
 HJR 10: Constitutional amendment for abolition of non-unanimous juries for criminal felony cases

Senate 
The Oregon State Senate is composed of 18 Democrats and 12 Republicans. Democrats gained one seat in District 3.

Senate President: Peter Courtney (D–11 Salem)
President Pro Tempore: Laurie Monnes Anderson (D–25 Gresham)
Majority Leader: Ginny Burdick (D–18 Portland) until May 22, 2020; Rob Wagner (D-19 Lake Oswego) after
Minority Leader: Herman Baertschiger Jr. (R-2 Grants Pass)

Events 

In May 2019, Republican state senators refused to attend senate sessions for four days, opposing a $2 billion tax package for K-12 schools. They only returned after making a deal with Oregon Governor Kate Brown that Democratic state senators would not field bills on guns and vaccines, would "reset" a cap-and-trade bill, and promised not to walk out again. Previous Oregon legislative walkouts have occurred in 2007 for Republicans and 2001, 1995  and 1971 for Democrats.

From June 20, 2019, all 11 Republican state senators for Oregon, including Girod, refused to show up for work at the Oregon State Capitol, instead going into hiding, some even fleeing the state. Their aim was to prevent a vote on a cap-and-trade proposal, House Bill 2020 that would dramatically lower greenhouse gas emissions by 2050 to combat climate change. The Senate holds 30 seats, but 1 is vacant due to the death of Republican Jackie Winters. Without the Republican senators, the remaining 18 Democratic state senators could not reach a quorum of 20 to hold a vote before the end of the legislative session on June 30, 2019. This tactic is known as quorum-busting.

Oregon Governor Kate Brown sent the Oregon State Police to bring the absent Republican senators back to the Capitol. In response, Republican Oregon Senator Brian Boquist said: "Send bachelors and come heavily armed. I'm not going to be a political prisoner in the state of Oregon." Right-wing militia groups have offered support for the Republican senators, with 3 Percenters declaring they would be "doing whatever it takes to keep these senators safe", and the Oath Keepers stating: "Gov. Brown, you want a civil war, because this is how you get a civil war". On June 22, 2019, a session of the Oregon Senate was cancelled when the Oregon State Capitol was closed due to a warning from the state police of a "possible militia threat". All but 2 of the Republican senators returned to the session by June 29.

In August 2019 Governor Brown considered calling a special session to address the impacts of recent death penalty legislation, but declined to do so when it became clear that the House of Representatives lacked the votes to ensure passage.

In February 2020 Republican senators walked out again, still in protest of the cap and trade legislation.

House
Based on the results of the 2018 elections, the Oregon House of Representatives is composed of 38 Democrats and 22 Republicans. Democrats gained three seats from the previous session.

Speaker: Tina Kotek (D–44 Portland)
Speaker Pro Tempore: Paul Holvey (D-8 Eugene)
Majority Leader: Jennifer Williamson (D–36 Portland) until July 7, 2019; Barbara Smith Warner (D-45 Portland) after
Minority Leader: Carl Wilson (R–3 Grants Pass) until September 16, 2019; Christine Drazan (R-39 Canby) after

See also
 2018 Oregon legislative election

References

External links 
 Chronology of regular legislative sessions from the Oregon Blue Book
 Chronology of special legislative sessions from the Blue Book

2019 in Oregon
2020 in Oregon
Oregon legislative sessions
2019 U.S. legislative sessions
2020 U.S. legislative sessions